Talukder Moniruzzaman (1 July 1938 – 29 December 2019) was a Bangladeshi political scientist. He was inducted as a National Professor by the Government of Bangladesh in 2006.

Biography
Moniruzzaman was born on 1 July 1938 at Tarakandi in Sirajganj.  He was admitted to Dhaka University's political science department in 1956. He completed his graduate and postgraduate studies from there.

After obtaining a postgraduate degree from Dhaka University, Moniruzzaman went to Canada in 1963 and was admitted to Queen's University. He returned to his country in 1966 and joined Rajshahi University. He taught there until 1974.

Moniruzzaman joined Dhaka University in 1974. He retired from there in 2006. He was inducted as a National Professor by the Government of Bangladesh in that year. He was also involved in writing books, writing a total of nine books.

Moniruzzaman was married to Razia Aktar Banu. They had two sons and one daughter.

Moniruzzaman died on 29 December 2019 in Apollo Hospital, Dhaka at the age of 81.

References

1938 births
2019 deaths
People from Sirajganj District
University of Dhaka alumni
Queen's University at Kingston alumni
Academic staff of the University of Rajshahi
Academic staff of the University of Dhaka
Bangladeshi political scientists
Bangladeshi male writers
National Professors of Bangladesh
Bangladeshi expatriates in Canada